Sa Kaeo railway station is a railway station located in Sa Kaeo Subdistrict, Sa Kaeo City, Sa Kaeo. Sa Kaeo Station opened in November 1926 as part of the Eastern Line Kabin Buri–Aranyaprathet section.

Train services 
 Ordinary train No. 275/276 Bangkok – Aranyaprathet – Bangkok
 Ordinary train No. 279/280 Bangkok – Aranyaprathet – Bangkok

References 
 
 
 

Railway stations in Thailand
Railway stations opened in 1926